The Wooden Church is a church in Cehei, Romania, built in the 18th century.

References

External links
 Cehei, Wooden church

Historic monuments in Sălaj County
18th-century churches in Romania
Wooden churches in Sălaj County
Șimleu Silvaniei